John Thomas Loughran (February 23, 1889 in Kingston, Ulster County, New York – March 31, 1953 in Kingston, Ulster County, New York) was an American lawyer and politician. He was Chief Judge of the New York Court of Appeals from 1945 until his death.

Life
He was a justice of the New York Supreme Court from 1931 to 1934.

On May 21, 1934, he was appointed to the New York Court of Appeals to fill the vacancy caused by the resignation of Henry T. Kellogg. In November 1934, he was elected on the Democratic and Republican tickets to a full 14-year term. In September 1945, after the death of Irving Lehman, Loughran was appointed Chief Judge of the Court of Appeals. In November 1946, he was re-elected unopposed to a 14-year term as Chief Judge, and died in office.

He died of a heart attack, and was buried at the St. Mary's Cemetery in Kingston, N.Y.

The John T. Loughran Bridge was named in his honor.

Sources
 Political Graveyard
 Appointed to Court of Appeals, in NYT on May 22, 1934 (subscription required)
 Obit in NYT on April 1, 1953 (subscription required)
 Listing of Court of Appeals judges, with portrait

1889 births
1953 deaths
Chief Judges of the New York Court of Appeals
New York Supreme Court Justices
Politicians from Kingston, New York
20th-century American judges